Josef Sami Boumedienne (born 12 January 1978) is a Swedish former professional hockey defenceman and hockey scout. He played in the National Hockey League (NHL) with the New Jersey Devils, Tampa Bay Lightning and Washington Capitals. He is currently serving as the Head of Pro Scouting for the Columbus Blue Jackets.

Playing career
Boumedienne started his career playing for Huddinge IK in the Swedish Allsvenskan in the season 1995–96. He was drafted by the New Jersey Devils in the 1996 NHL Entry Draft as their third-round pick, #91 overall. Boumedienne moved to play for Södertälje SK in the Elitserien. After two seasons with Södertälje SK he went to play with Tappara in the Finnish SM-liiga.

Boumedienne played two seasons with Tappara and in the 1999–00 season he led the team's defenders with 8 goals and 24 assists for 32 points. In the 2000–01 season he moved to the NHL, playing his first season on New Jersey's farm team, the Albany River Rats in the AHL. The next season he made his NHL debut on 6 October 2001 and played one game with New Jersey Devils, scoring his first NHL goal. In November 2001 the Devils traded Boumedienne along with Sascha Goc and Anton Butin to the Tampa Bay Lightning, in exchange for Andrei Zyuzin.

Boumedienne played three games with the Lightning, playing mainly with the Lightning's farm team, the Springfield Falcons. In 2002 Tampa Bay traded Boumedienne to the Ottawa Senators for a seventh-round draft pick. He played with the Senators organization until December 2002, when the Senators traded him to the Washington Capitals for Dean Melanson. He started his Capitals career playing mainly on the Capitals' farm team Portland Pirates, playing six games with the Capitals. In the 2003–04 season he continued with the Capitals, playing 37 games with the team. After a successful season he received a one-year contract extension from the Capitals.

In the NHL lockout season of 2004–05, Boumedienne started his season with Brynäs IF in Sweden's Elitserien. Only 13 games later, he moved to the SM-liiga when SML-team Kärpät acquired him. He won the Finnish championship with the team. In the 2005–06 season he started with the Zürich Lions in the Swiss NLA, but was released by the team after 17 games, where he scored 1 goal and 10 assists. According to the Zürich Lions, Boumedienne's defending was poor, leading to his release. He played the rest of the season with Södertälje SK, in the Elitserien.

Boumedienne signed a two-year contract with Kärpät in November 2006. He missed the start of the season due to abdominal surgery. In April 2007 Boumedienne won his second Finnish championship with Kärpät.

In the summer 2007 Boumedienne signed a one-year, one-way contract with the Washington Capitals. He played the entire season with the Hershey Bears. In the 2008–09 season he moved to the Toronto Maple Leafs organization, playing 19 games with the Toronto Marlies. After this he returned to SM-liiga, winning his third SM-medal, gaining a silver with Kärpät.

For the 2009–10 season Boumedienne started with Dynamo Minsk in the KHL. However, he was released by Minsk, even though he led all Minsk defenders in points, with 7 points in 17 games.

In 2010 Boumedienne moved to play with EV Zug in the NLA. After the season Djurgårdens IF acquired Boumedienne on a one-year contract, with an option for 2011–12. On 30 January 2012, Finnish club Jokerit acquired Boumedienne and signed him to a contract for the rest of the season.

Boumedienne's last season of his professional career was in 2012–13, initially with HC Bratislava Slovan of the Kontinental Hockey League, finishing with Oulun Kärpät in the SM-liiga.

Scouting and Coaching Career
Boumedienne was hired as a scout by the Columbus Blue Jackets in 2013, and was then promoted to Director of European Scouting in 2016. He served as a scout for Lukko, and a late season head coaching position with Brynas in 2021 to keep them from being relegated. He was promoted to Director of Pro Scouting with Columbus in 2021

International
Boumedienne played for Sweden's national team at the European Hockey Tour, and has held Finnish nationality in addition since 2004.

Personal
Boumedienne is the son of an Algerian father and a Finnish mother. He is married, and has 3 sons.

Career statistics

Regular season and playoffs

International

Awards and honours

References

External links
 

1978 births
Albany River Rats players
Brynäs IF players
Columbus Blue Jackets scouts
Djurgårdens IF Hockey players
Huddinge IK players
Jokerit players
Living people
New Jersey Devils draft picks
New Jersey Devils players
Oulun Kärpät players
Södertälje SK players
Ice hockey people from Stockholm
Swedish expatriate ice hockey players in Finland
Swedish expatriate ice hockey players in the United States
Swedish ice hockey defencemen
Swedish people of Algerian descent
Swedish sportspeople of African descent
Swedish people of Finnish descent
Tampa Bay Lightning players
Tappara players
Toronto Marlies players
Washington Capitals players
Finnish people of Algerian descent
Naturalized citizens of Finland